Alexandr Mikhailovich Dobrolyubov (1876 — summer or autumn 1945) was a Russian Symbolist poet, well known mostly for his creative energy rather than his poetry.
Aleksander Mikhailovich Dobrolubov was a successor to a long line of wanderers or pilgrims in Russia's history. Such people abandoned their secular associates, means of income, permanent home, family, and subjection to the state, and departed into society as religious nomads, working wherever work would be offered them. This was their moral self-perfection, Christian self-realization, departure from sin and attainment of holiness. Dobrolubov was Russia's mystic pilgrim, preaching his version of Christian spirituality in central Russia, Siberia and central Asia, during the early years of Soviet Russia. Living the Holy Spirit, walking and thinking in the Holy Spirit, every day and in every activity, this was Aleksandr Dobrolubov. He wrote a book of his spiritual experiences titled, From the Invisible Book. It is a compilation of his divine poetry, visions and revelations, and his concept of the Holy Spirit life. Born in 1876, he died in about 1943.

External links 
 Aleksandr Dobrolubov: Russia's Mystic Pilgrim, A biography by Daniel H. Shubin, with a translation from Russian into English of The Invisible Book. 

1876 births
1945 deaths
Russian male poets
Symbolist poets